John Edward Somerville (14 August 1911 – 2 December 1999) was an Australian rules footballer who played with Footscray in the Victorian Football League (VFL).

Notes

External links 

1911 births
1999 deaths
Australian rules footballers from Victoria (Australia)
Western Bulldogs players